Remo Stefanoni (born 10 September 1940) is an Italian racing cyclist. He rode in the 1965 Tour de France.

References

External links
 

1940 births
Living people
Italian male cyclists
Place of birth missing (living people)
Cyclists from the Province of Varese